Niall McKenna (born 1994) is a hurler from Northern Ireland who plays for Antrim Championship club Patrick Sarsfields and at inter-county level with the Antrim senior hurling team. He usually lines out as a wing-forward.

Career

A member of the Patrick Sarsfields club in Belfast, McKenna was part of the club's 2017 County Intermediate Championship-winning team. He first came to prominence on the inter-county scene with the Antrim minor team that won the Ulster Minor Championship title in 2011. McKenna subsequently won three consecutive Ulster Championships with the under-21 team and was at wing-forward for the 2013 All-Ireland U21 final defeat by Wexford. As a member of the Antrim senior hurling team he has won two Ulster Championship titles, a National League Division 2A title and a Joe McDonagh Cup title. McKenna also spent a season lining out with Warwickshire in th2 Nicky Rackard Cup.

Honours

Patrick Sarsfields
Antrim Intermediate Hurling Championship: 2017

Antrim
Ulster Senior Hurling Championship: 2013, 2015
Joe McDonagh Cup: 2020
National Hurling League Division 2A: 2017
Ulster Under-21 Hurling Championship: 2013, 2014, 2015
Ulster Minor Hurling Championship: 2011

References

External links
Niall McKenna profile at the Antrim GAA website

1994 births
Living people
Antrim inter-county hurlers